Jialuhe railway station is a closed station on the Zhengzhou–Kaifeng intercity railway. The station is located at the crossing of Zhengkai Avenue and Zhengxin Road, Zhengzhou, Henan, China.

History
The station was originally named Zhengxinlu Station. It was changed to the current name prior to its opening along with the Zhengzhou–Kaifeng Intercity Railway in December 2014.

On 10 January 2016, the station was closed due to lack of passengers.

Station layout
The station is an elevated train station located at the southwest corner of the crossing of Zhengkai Avenue and Zhengxin Road. The ticket offices and waiting rooms are on the ground level, beneath the platforms and tracks, which are on the second floor. The station has two side platforms and two tracks. The northern platform is for trains towards  and the southern platform is for trains towards .

References

Railway stations in Henan
Railway stations in Zhengzhou
Stations on the Zhengzhou–Kaifeng Intercity Railway
Railway stations in China opened in 2014
Railway stations closed in 2016